Karate is an American band, formed in Boston, Massachusetts in 1993 by Geoff Farina, Eamonn Vitt and Gavin McCarthy, with Jeff Goddard joining in 1995. The band split up in 2005 before reuniting in 2022.

The band is characterized by fusion of indie rock, emo, post-hardcore, post-rock and jazz, with the jazz influence becoming more dominant in later releases.

History
In 1993, Karate was formed by Geoff Farina (vocals, guitar), Eamonn Vitt (bass) and Gavin McCarthy (drums). In 1995, Jeff Goddard joined the band as bass player, and Vitt moved to second guitar. Previously in 1998, after moving to Chicago, Goddard had form the band Jones Very, with Vic Bondi and Jamie Van Bramer.

Vitt departed Karate to pursue a medical career in 1997.

Their music was primarily released on Southern Records.

Break-up
Farina developed hearing problems due to twelve years of performance with Karate and was forced to disband the group in July 2005. Disbanding with fanfare the group had recorded six studio albums and had almost seven hundred performances in twenty countries. Their final show was played in Rome, Italy, on July 10, 2005.

Post break-up 
In 2007, the former band members decided to release the live album 595. It is a recording of the bands 595th performance on May 5 at Stuk, Leuven, Belgium. Sent to them by a sound technician, Karate were so astonished by the quality they decided to release it as an official live album.

Karate's perfectionism and attention to detail is well known among the music scene; which played a part in the naming of 595. It was originally to be called 594. However, McCarthy discovered a flyer for a forgotten early show, so the band quickly changed the title to 595. 

In 2005, Goddard played bass on the Chris Brokaw album Incredible Love.

Farina has developed a solo career, releasing three albums and a number of EPs. He has worked with Chris Brokaw, releasing work as Geoff Farina & Chris Brokaw.

McCarthy has been part of a number of bands including E which released albums in 2016 and 2018.

In 2021, The Numero Group, digitally reissued the band's first two albums and first single.

In 2022, Stereogum reported that the band would be reuniting for their first live tour in 17 years. It was announced in November that the band would play Primavera Sound festival in 2023.

Discography

Studio albums 
 Karate LP/CD (1995, Southern Records 18534)
 In Place of Real Insight LP/CD (1997, Southern Records 18543)
 The Bed is in the Ocean LP/CD (1998, Southern Records 18554)
 Unsolved CD/2×LP (October 2000/March 2001, Southern Records 18584)
 Some Boots LP/CD (October 2002, Southern Records 18599)
 Pockets CD/LP (August 2004, Southern Records 28114)

Live albums 
 595 CD/2×LP (October 2007, Southern Records)

Compilations 
 Time Expired CD/LP (October 2022, Numero Group)

EPs and 7-inch records
 Death Kit/Nerve 7-inch single (1995, The Self Starter Foundation PSP1)
 Karate/The Lune split 7-inch with The Lune (1996, Lonesone Pine Records LPR1)
song – "The Schwinn"
 The Crownhate Ruin/Karate split 7-inch with The Crownhate Ruin (1996, Art Monk Construction ART11)
song – "Cherry Coke"
 Operation: Sand/Empty There (1997, Southern Records 18553)
 Cancel/Sing EP CD (2001, Southern Records 18594)
 Concerto al Barchessone Vecchio EP (2003, Fooltribe  FT02)
 In the Fishtank 12 EP (February 2005, Konkurrent Records – Netherlands)

References

External links
Geoff Farina's official website
Gavin McCarthy's official website

American post-rock groups
Indie rock musical groups from Massachusetts
Musical groups from Boston
Musical groups established in 1993
1993 establishments in Massachusetts